Peak power output (PPO), also known as "peak work rate" is a common measure of exercise intensity. For example, researchers may ask subjects to complete an incremental exercise test where VO2max is measured while the person cycles at increasingly difficult power generation levels as measured by a cycle ergometer.

See also
Human power

References

Exercise physiology
Sports terminology